The Royal Botanic Society was a learned society founded in 1839 by James de Carle Sowerby under a royal charter to the Duke of Norfolk and others. Its purpose was to promote "botany in all its branches, and its applications." Sowerby remained as secretary for some 30 years, and J. B. Sowerby and W. Sowerby later also served as secretaries. The garden was open to members and their guests and also to the general public for a fee on certain days of the week. It included large palm-houses and a water-lily house. In the summer, flowershows, fetes, and other entertainments were held there.

In 1932 it failed to secure a renewal of the lease, and the Society was dissolved. Its surviving records were deposited in the St. Marylebone Public Library.

The site became Queen Mary's Gardens, which is run by the Royal Parks Agency, and is fully open to the general public without charge as part of Regent's Park.

References

External links
http://www.nationalarchives.gov.uk/a2a/records.aspx?cat=094-rbs&cid=0
http://www.gardenvisit.com/book/history_of_garden_design_and_gardening/chapter_4_british__gardens_(1100-1830)/royal_botanic_society_in__regents_park

Defunct learned societies of the United Kingdom
Gardening in England
Organizations established in 1839
1839 establishments in England
1932 disestablishments in England
Organizations disestablished in 1932
Organisations based in London
Gardens in London